A collective is a group of entities that share or are motivated by at least one common issue or interest, or work together to achieve a common objective. Collectives can differ from cooperatives in that they are not necessarily focused upon an economic benefit or saving, but can be that as well.

The term "collective" is sometimes used to describe a species as a whole—for example, the human collective.

For political purposes, a collective is defined by decentralized, or "majority-rules" decision making styles.

Types of groups
Collectives are sometimes characterised by attempts to share and exercise political and social power and to make decisions on a consensus-driven and egalitarian basis. 

A commune or intentional community, which may also be known as a "collective household", is a group of people who live together in some kind of dwelling or residence, or in some other arrangement (e.g., sharing land). Collective households may be organized for a specific purpose (e.g., relating to business, parenting, or some other shared interest).

Artist collectives, including musical collectives, are typically a collection of individuals with similar interests in producing and documenting art as a group. These groups can range in size from a few people to thousands of members. The style of art produced can have vast differences. Motivations can be for a common cause or individually motivated purposes. Some collectives are simply people who enjoy painting with someone else and have no other goals or motivations for forming their collective.

A worker cooperative is a type of horizontal collective wherein a business functions as a partnership of individual professionals, recognizing them as equals and rewarding them for their expertise. The working collective aims to reduce costs to clients while maintaining healthy rewards for participating partners. This is accomplished by eliminating the operating costs that are needed to support levels of management.

See also

Collective farming
Collective intentionality
Collective bargaining
Corporatism
Collective agreement
Collective security
Coparenting#Coparenting by more than two adults
Discursive dilemma
Collective ownership
Green Mountain Anarchist Collective
Kibbutz
Kolkhoz
Law collective
Mutual aid

References

Further reading
List, Christian & Philip Pettit. (2011) Group Agency: the possibility, design, and status of corporate agents. Oxford: Oxford University Press.
Curl, John. (2009) For All The People: Uncovering the Hidden History of Cooperation, Cooperative Movements, and Communalism in America. PM Press. 
 David Van Deusen, 2015, ''The Rise and Fall of The Green Mountain Anarchist Collective' .

Community